Mokena is one of two commuter rail stations along Metra's Rock Island District line that are located in  Mokena, Illinois. In Metra's fare-based system, Mokena is in zone F. As of 2018, Mokena is the 90th busiest of Metra's 236 non-downtown stations, with an average of 559 weekday boardings.

As of 2022, Mokena is served by 21 trains in each direction on weekdays, by 10 inbound trains and 11 outbound trains on Saturdays, and by eight trains in each direction on Sundays.

Unlike  to the east, Mokena has both a waiting room and a ticket agency window. Parking is available on Front Street between Wolf Road and Mokena Street, as well as on the northwest corner of McGovney Street and Mokena Street. Additional parking can be found further northwest on Willow Crest Lane off of Wolf Road, and at the Village Hall to the northeast on the corners of Division, Third, and Carpenter Streets. Currently, no bus connections are available at the station.

Tracks
There are two tracks at Mokena. Trains from Chicago run on track 2 (the north track) and trains to Chicago run on track 1 (the south track.)

References

External links

Metra stations in Illinois
Railway stations in Will County, Illinois